Highway 221 is a highway in the Canadian province of Saskatchewan. It runs from Highway 21 to the Centre Block of Cypress Hills Interprovincial Park.

References

221